Natalie Preston (born 16 August 1977) is an English female former football midfielder.

Club career
Preston captained Tranmere Rovers Ladies before joining Leeds Carnegie in the 2003 close season. She went on to captain Leeds.

In May 2006, Preston played for Leeds as they lost 5–0 to Arsenal Ladies in the FA Women's Cup final.

Preston joined Blackburn Rovers Ladies in the 2007 close season.

In October 2008, Preston was one of four Rovers players to be sent off, the others being Katie Anderton, Jenna Carroll and Natalie Brewer, as they drew 4–4 in the Women's Premier League Cup against Portsmouth Ladies.

In the 2010 close season she moved to Liverpool Ladies, scoring in a friendly defeat to Atlético Madrid Féminas, but she retired before the start of the 2011 FA WSL season.

She has also played for Everton Ladies.

International career
Preston has represented England at youth level.

Personal life
While with Tranmere and Leeds, Preston had a cat named Susie Wong, which resulted in Sue Smith, her teammate at both clubs, gaining the nickname 'Wongy'.

Blackburn statistics
Up to October 2009

References

1977 births
Living people
English women's footballers
Everton F.C. (women) players
Leeds United Women F.C. players
Tranmere Rovers L.F.C. players
Blackburn Rovers L.F.C. players
FA Women's National League players
Footballers from Liverpool
Women's association football midfielders